Thomas Apem Nyarko is the member of parliament for the constituency. He was elected on the ticket of the National Democratic Congress (NDC) and won a majority of 1,135 votes to become the MP. He succeeded Kofi Osei Ameyaw who had represented the constituency in the 6th Republic parliament on the ticket of the New Patriotic Party (NPP).

Members of Parliament

See also
List of Ghana Parliament constituencies

References

Parliamentary constituencies in the Eastern Region (Ghana)